Nicole Clerico (born 8 March 1983) is a retired Italian tennis player.

On 21 September 2009, she reached her highest singles ranking of world No. 381. On 11 October 2010, she peaked at No. 171 in the WTA doubles rankings.

Clerico, who started playing tennis at the age of eight, was coached by Matteo Costa. In her career, she won 27 doubles titles on the ITF Women's Circuit.

In 2015, Clerico retired from professional tennis.

ITF finals

Singles: 3 (3 runner-ups)

Doubles: 71 (27–44)

References

External links
 
 

1983 births
Living people
People from Cuneo
Italian female tennis players
Sportspeople from the Province of Cuneo
20th-century Italian women
21st-century Italian women